Redmond Óg Murphy (11 October 2000 – 1 April 2022) was an Irish Gaelic footballer who played for Sligo Senior Championship club Curry and at inter-county level with the Sligo senior football team. He usually lined out as a forward.

Career
Murphy played football as a schoolboy at St Attracta's College in Tubbercurry, while lining out at juvenile and underage levels with the Curry club. He first appeared on the inter-county scene as a member of the Sligo minor football team in 2017. Murphy made the switch to Australian rules football after signing for North Melbourne Football Club in 2018. After one season in the Australian Football League he returned to Ireland and linked up with DCU Dóchas Éireann and the Sligo under-20 football team in 2020. Murphy made his senior team debut during the 2020 National Football League. He was a regular on the team for two seasons before stepping away in November 2021.

Death
Murphy died by suicide on 1 April 2022, aged 21.

Speaking to The Irish Times in November 2022, eight months on after his death, Murphy's parents Geraldine and Redmond said nobody knows why he did it and that he had no history of mental health issues and he gave no hint to anyone that he was struggling. In December, his parents appealed to anyone suffering mental health issues in silence to reach out to a loved one or a professional for help this Christmas.

Career statistics

References

External link
Red Óg Murphy player profile on the Footywire website

2000 births
2022 deaths
DCU Gaelic footballers
Curry Gaelic footballers
Gaelic footballers who switched code
Irish players of Australian rules football
Sligo inter-county Gaelic footballers